USS O'Brien (Destroyer No. 51/DD-51) was the lead ship of s built for the United States Navy prior to the American entry into World War I. The ship was the second US Navy vessel named in honor of Jeremiah O'Brien and his five brothers Gideon, John, William, Dennis, and Joseph who, together on the sloop Unity, captured a British warship during the American Revolutionary War.

O'Brien was laid down by William Cramp & Sons of Philadelphia in September 1913 and launched in July 1914.

After her May 1915 commissioning, O'Brien sailed off the east coast and in the Caribbean. After the United States entered World War I in April 1917, O'Brien was sent overseas to patrol the Irish Sea out of Queenstown, Ireland.

After returning to the United States in January 1919, O'Brien revisited European waters in May to serve as one of the picket ships for the NC-type seaplanes in the first aerial crossing of the Atlantic. O'Brien was decommissioned at Philadelphia in June 1922. She was struck from the Naval Vessel Register in March 1935 and sold for scrapping in April.

Design and construction
Construction of the vessel was awarded to William Cramp & Sons of Philadelphia which laid down her keel on 8 September 1913. On 20 July 1914, O'Brien was launched by sponsor Miss Marcia Bradbury Campbell, great-great-granddaughter of Gideon O'Brien, one of the ship's namesakes. Gideon and his four brothers—John, William, Dennis, and Joseph—were crewmen aboard sloop Unity, under the command of their brother Jeremiah O'Brien, when that vessel captured  on 12 June 1775 during the American Revolutionary War; the destroyer O'Brien was named after all six brothers, and was the second US Navy vessel named in their honor.

O'Brien had two Zoelly steam turbines that drove her two screw propellers, and an additional pair triple-expansion steam engines, each connected to one of the propeller shafts, for cruising purposes.

O'Brien was also equipped with four twin 21 inch (533 mm) torpedo tubes. The General Board of the United States Navy had called for two anti-aircraft guns for the O'Brien-class ships, as well as provisions for laying up to 36 floating mines. From sources, it is unclear if these recommendations were followed for O'Brien or any of the other ships of the class.

Pre-World War I
O'Brien was commissioned into the United States Navy on 22 May 1915 under the command of Lieutenant Commander C. E. Courtney, after which she conducted her shakedown cruise between Newport, Rhode Island, and Hampton Roads, Virginia. In fleet exercises off New York in November, O'Brien collided with the destroyer , in a minor incident that carried away part of Draytons topmast and wireless gear. In December, she was assigned to the 5th Division, Torpedo Flotilla, Atlantic Fleet. From early 1916-spring of 1917, she operated with the Fleet along the East Coast and in Cuban waters.

At 05:30 on 8 October 1916, wireless reports came in of a German submarine stopping ships near the Lightship Nantucket, off the eastern end of Long Island. After an SOS from the British steamer  was received at about 12:30, Rear Admiral Albert Gleaves ordered O'Brien and other destroyers at Newport to attend to survivors.

The American destroyers arrived on the scene at about 17:00 when the U-boat,  under the command of Kapitänleutnant Hans Rose, was in the process of stopping the Holland-America Line cargo ship . Shortly after, U-53 stopped the British passenger ship . As Rose had done with three other ships U-53 had sunk earlier in the day, he gave passengers and crew aboard Blommersdijk and Stephano adequate time to abandon the ships before sinking the pair. In total, 226 survivors from U-53s five victims were rescued by the destroyer flotilla.

In February 1917, one of O'Briens gun crews hit a target at  eight times in eight attempts with one of the destroyer's  guns, a feat which earned the crew and O'Brien recognition in The Independent, a weekly newsmagazine published in Boston.

World War I
Upon arrival at Queenstown on 24 May, O'Brien was assigned to the 6th Destroyer Division which cooperated with the British forces. She patrolled off the Irish coast in company with other destroyers answering distress calls and meeting eastbound convoys to escort them through the war zone.

Heading toward the submarine for an attack, a lookout in the foretop saw the submerged boat pass close along the starboard side. A depth charge was dropped but no immediate evidence of damage was found. Nearly three hours later, the British vessel  reported a large patch of oil in approximately the same position. The next morning, Cushing also reported and confirmed Jessamines report. The British Admiralty believed the submarine was probably seriously damaged. However, later investigation reveals that German submarine , the submarine in question, continued to operate and completed her cruise.

In the summer of 1918, O'Brien was transferred to the French coast where she continued her antisubmarine patrols through the end of the war.

Inter-war period 
After the signing of the Armistice on 11 November, which ended all fighting, O'Brien transported mail and passengers between Brest, France, and Plymouth, England. She returned to New York on 8 January 1919, but returned to European waters in May when she served as one of the rescue pickets stationed along the route across the Atlantic flown by three Navy NC-type seaplanes in the first aerial crossing of the Atlantic.

In 1919, she assisted in the unsuccessful first attempt to lay the Ambrose Channel pilot cable. In July 1920, she was assigned the hull code of DD-51 under the US Navy's alphanumeric classification system. O'Brien was decommissioned at Philadelphia on 5 June 1922. The ship was struck from the Naval Vessel Register on 8 March 1935, and broken up at the Philadelphia Navy Yard, and her materials sold for scrap on 23 April. The ship's bell remains in the Plattsburgh Memorial Chapel on the former Plattsburgh Air Force Base.

Notes

References

Bibliography

External links

O'Brien-class destroyers
Ships built by William Cramp & Sons
1914 ships
World War I destroyers of the United States